Lee Township is one of the fourteen townships of Athens County, Ohio, United States. The 2010 census found 2,729 people in the township.

Geography
Located in the southwestern corner of the county, it borders the following townships:
Waterloo Township - north
Athens Township - northeast corner
Alexander Township - east
Scipio Township, Meigs County - southeast corner
Columbia Township, Meigs County - south
Knox Township, Vinton County - west

Most of the village of Albany is located in southeastern Lee Township.

Name and history
Lee Township was organized in 1819.

Statewide, other Lee Townships are located in Carroll and Monroe counties.

Government
The township is governed by a three-member board of trustees, who are elected in November of odd-numbered years to a four-year term beginning on the following January 1. Two are elected in the year after the presidential election and one is elected in the year before it. There is also an elected township fiscal officer, who serves a four-year term beginning on April 1 of the year after the election, which is held in November of the year before the presidential election. Vacancies in the fiscal officership or on the board of trustees are filled by the remaining trustees.

References

External links
County website

Townships in Athens County, Ohio
1819 establishments in Ohio
Populated places established in 1819
Townships in Ohio